The Law Enforcement Officers Memorial of Allegheny County is a monument to Allegheny County, Pennsylvania's law enforcement community in honor of fallen officers of both the Pittsburgh Police and suburban departments.
The original was dedicated in September 1996 near the Carnegie Science Center but was moved with the construction of Heinz Field and rededicated in May 2003.

Fallen officers
The officers honored from the Pittsburgh & Allegheny County agencies are:

2010s
(Port Authority of Allegheny County) K9 Aren, Thursday, January 31, 2016, Stabbed
K9 Rocco, Thursday, January 30, 2014, Stabbed

2000s
(Penn Hills) Police Officer Michael James Crawshaw, Sunday, December 6, 2009, Gunfire
Ofc. Paul John Rizzo Domenic Sciullo, II Saturday, April 4, 2009, Gunfire 
Ofc. Eric Guy Kelly, Saturday, April 4, 2009, Gunfire 
Ofc. Stephen James Mayhle, Saturday, April 4, 2009, Gunfire 
K9 Ulf, Tuesday, May 6, 2008, Gunfire
State Corporal Joseph Raymond Pokorny, Jr., Monday, December 12, 2005, Gunfire
State Trooper Tod C. Kelly, Wednesday, November 7, 2001, Vehicle

1990s
Sgt. James Henry Taylor, Jr., Friday, September 22, 1995, Gunfire 
(McKeesport) Police Officer Frank A. Miller, Jr., Wednesday, November 10, 1993, Gunfire
K9 Jupp, Friday, June 21, 1991, Vehicle 
Ofc. Joseph J. Grill, Wednesday, March 6, 1991, Vehicle 
Ofc. Thomas L. Herron, Wednesday, March 6, 1991, Vehicle 
(Hampton) Police Officer Ralph Henry Mock, Jr., Monday, January 28, 1991, Vehicle
Sgt. James T. Blair, Monday, November 26, 1990, Motorcycle

1980s
(Bethel Park) Detective Lynn Russell Sutter, Saturday, March 28, 1987, Gunfire
State Trooper Clinton Wayne Crawford, Monday, August 17, 1987, Vehicle 
(Penn Hills) K9 Joker, Monday, February 2, 1987, Stabbed
(Sheriff) Sgt. James Robert Milcarek, Sr., Friday, November 18, 1983, Vehicle
Dpty. Sheriff Edward M. Butko, Jr., September 29, 1983, Vehicle
Det. Norman A. Stewart, Friday, September 16, 1983, Gunfire
Patrolmen David A. Barr, Tuesday, May 3, 1983, Gunfire

1970s
County Patrolman Thomas A. Daley, Friday, March 26, 1976, Animal
K9 Fritz, Monday, April 28, 1975, Fall
(Bell Acres) Patrolman John Sherba, Thursday, March 13, 1975, Vehicle
Police Officer Patrick J. Wallace, Jr., Wednesday, July 3, 1974, Gunfire
(Corrections) Captain Walter L. Peterson, Monday, December 10, 1973, Assault
(McCandless) Patrolman Albert William Devlin, Monday, January 8, 1973, Vehicle
(Whitaker) Patrolman Frederick Lippert, Thursday, October 5, 1972, Vehicle
(Robinson) Lt. William B. Mays, Thursday, June 29, 1972, Heart attack
(Penn Hills)Patrol Officer Bartley J. Connolly, Jr., Saturday, March 25, 1972, Gunfire
(Penn Hills) Sergeant William Edward Schrott, Saturday, March 25, 1972, Gunfire
Patrolman William J. Otis, Wednesday, March 3, 1971, Gunfire 
Patrolman John Leslie Scott, Wednesday, October 14, 1970, Gunfire

1960s
(Verona) Police Officer Joseph Paul Zanella, Friday, September 19, 1969, Gunfire
(Monroeville) Sergeant Andrew Robert Rusbarsky), Tuesday, October 29, 1968, Vehicle
Patrolman James Edward Graff, Friday, February 23, 1968, Heart attack
(Verona) Lt. Joseph Rafay, Jr., Thursday, January 19, 1967, Heart attack
Patrolman Joseph Francis Gaetano, Friday, June 10, 1966, Gunfire
(Corrections) Correctional Officer Clifford J. Grogan, Friday, November 12, 1965, Stabbed 
Patrolman Coleman Regis McDonough, Monday, July 5, 1965, Gunfire
(Homestead) Patrolman Joseph G. Lecak, Thursday, October 26, 1961, Vehicle

1950s
(Northumberland) Sheriff James R. Lauer, Wednesday, May 27, 1959, Gunfire
Patrolman James V. Timpona, Thursday, October 16, 1958, Streetcar
State Trooper Edward Mackiw, Saturday, May 31, 1958, Vehicle 
(Scott) Captain Edward J. Hilker, Sunday, September 16, 1956, Heart attack
Det. James R. Kelly, Friday, June 3, 1955, Heart attack 
County Patrolman John W. Timmons, Saturday, March 19, 1955, Vehicle
Patrolman John G. Gillespie, Tuesdasy, January 25, 1955, Vehicle
(Fawn) Chief of Police Lloyd J. Hine, Monday, August 30, 1954, Vehicle
Patrolman William H. Heagy, Thursday, March 25, 1954, Gunfire 
(Verona) Police Officer Charles McKinley, Thursday, February 4, 1954, Gunfire
Patrolman Edward V. Tierney, Jr., Tuesday, July 28, 1953, Motorcycle  
Patrolman William R. Ewing, Saturday, February 7, 1953, Motorcycle

1940s
(Bethel Park) Patrolman Joseph Chmelynski, Tuesday, March 9, 1948, Gunfire
(Braddock) Patrolman Benjamin Harrison Manson, Sunday, October 5, 1947, Train
Lt. William J. "Jack" Lavery, Tuesday, August 5, 1947, Electrocuted 
Patrolman Louis G. Spencer, Tuesday, December 24, 1946, Gunfire 
Patrolman Arthur A. MacDonald, Friday, March 16, 1945, Heart attack 
County Det. Albert T. Lorch, Friday, October 1, 1943, Gunfire
Patrolman Toby J. Brown, Saturday, August 23, 1941, Gunfire

1930s
Patrolman Edward M. Conway, Tuesday, June 27, 1939, Gunfire 
(West Homestead) Captain Edward A. O'Donnell, Monday, May 2, 1938, Motorcycle
Patrolman John J. Scanlon, Saturday, August 21, 1937, Automobile 
(Pittsburgh Railways) Patrolman George Washington Huff, Wednesday, March 3, 1937, Vehicle
Patrolman George A. Kelly, Friday, February 12, 1937, Vehicle 
Patrolman Charles M. Snyder, Monday, January 25, 1937, Drowned 
Inspector Albert L. Jacks, Friday, April 17, 1936, Illness 
(McKeesport) Patrolman John H. Sellman, Wednesday, March 18, 1936, Drowned
Patrolman Robert L. Kosmal, Saturday, August 17, 1935, Gunfire 
Patrolman Roy W. Freiss, Sunday, February 3, 1935, Vehicle 
Patrolman George J. Sallade, Thursday, October 5, 1933, Vehicle 
State Patrolman Herbert P. Brantlinger, Sunday, September 3, 1933, Gunfire
(Bellevue) Chief of Police Daniel V. Rosemeier, Friday, July 6, 1934, Heart attack
(Brentwood) Police Officer Emil Carl Kehr, Tuesday, December 6, 1932, Motorcycle
(McKeesport) Patrolman Charles Bartlett, Sunday, November 20, 1932, Heart attack
(Ross) Chief of Police Vernon Porter Moses, Tuesday, May 3, 1932, Gunfire
(Munhall) Police Officer Frank E. Moore, Sunday, January 17, 1932, Motorcycle
(Cheswick) Patrolman John Polcsak, Wednesday, August 26, 1931, Vehicle
(Ingram) Police Officer Louis Edward Wagner, Sunday, July 5, 1931, Motorcycle
(Braddock) Patrolman John F. Podowski, Sunday, April 5, 1931, Vehicle
Patrolman Joseph J. Beran, Wednesday, January 28, 1931, Vehicle
(McKees Rocks) Patrolman Grover Wolf, Friday, November 14, 1930, Gunfire 
(West Elizabeth) Patrolman Clarence A. Jones, Monday, October 27, 1930, Motorcycle
Patrolman Anthony E. Rahe, Thursday, August 7, 1930, Motorcycle 
Patrolman Orrie N. Murray, Wednesday, June 25, 1930, Motorcycle

1920s
Patrolman James E. Hughes, Friday, December 27, 1929, Gunfire 
Patrolman Silas T. Yimin, Thursday, November 28, 1929, Illness
Patrolman Stephen Janeda, Monday, July 15, 1929, Motorcycle 
Patrolman John Joseph Schemm, Friday, December 21, 1928, Fall
(Edgewood) Chief of Police John L. Nye, Monday, November 5, 1928, Motorcycle 
Patrolman Ralph P. Gentile, Thursday, November 1, 1928, Motorcycle 
(Braddock) Patrolman Andrew Katnik, Thursday, December 29, 1927, Gunfire
(Homestead) Captain Patrick J. Mullen, Thursday, November 10, 1927, Accidental
Patrolman William P. Johnson, Sunday, October 23, 1927, Gunfire 
(West View) Chief William A. Quigley, Tuesday, September 27, 1927, Vehicle
State Private John T. Downey, Monday, August 22, 1927, Gunfire
Patrolman James F. Farrell, Wednesday, July 6, 1927, Gunfire
(Rankin) Sergeant George L. MacPhee, Friday, April 9, 1926, Gunfire 
Patrolman Charles Lewis Cooper, Jr., Tuesday, August 18, 1925, Gunfire 
Lt. Albert Bert Burris, Tuesday, June 30, 1925, Heart attack 
(Braddock) Patrolman Charles W. Hanson, Thursday, April 9, 1925, Motorcycle
Patrolman Samuel R. McGreevy, Thursday, October 9, 1924, Vehicle 
Lt. Robert J. Galloway, Tuesday, August 26, 1924, Gunfire 
Patrolman Joseph L. Riley, Sunday, August 3, 1924, Vehicle 
Deputy Sheriff Meyer Van Lewen, Saturday, July 19, 1924, Gunfire
Patrolman Joseph Jovanovic, Monday, July 7, 1924, Gunfire 
(Stowe) Patrolman Harry Homer, Monday, June 15, 1924, Motorcycle
(McKeesport) Patrolman Max Lefkowitz, Wednesday, May 14, 1924, Gunfire
(Corrections) Deputy Warden John A. Pieper, Monday, February 11, 1924, Gunfire
(Corrections) Corrections Officer John T. Coax, Monday, February 11, 1924, Gunfire
Patrolman John Joseph Rudolph, Tuesday, April 3, 1923, Motorcycle  
Sgt. Casper Thomas Schmotzer, Tuesday, January 23, 1923, Gunfire
Patrolman Daniel John Conley, Saturday, December 30, 1923, Gunfire 
Patrolman Edward George Couch, Monday, October 30, 1922, Gunfire 
(Neville) Chief of Police Arthur Stanley Phillips, Thursday, July 27, 1922, Motorcycle
(McKeesport) Patrolman Charles F. Paist, Sunday, May 14, 1922, Motorcycle
(Dormont) Police Officer Joseph A. Coghill, Sunday, December 25, 1921
(Etna) Police Officer James F. Lewis, Monday, May 9, 1921, Vehicle
Patrolman William J. Johnston, Monday, May 2, 1921, Streetcar
Detective Peter K. Tsorvas, Tuesday, November 2, 1920, Gunfire
(Homestead) Patrolman William Frank Smith, Wednesday, October 6, 1920, Gunfire

1910s
(Munhall) Patrolman Ignatius T. Brown, Friday, September 12, 1919, Vehicle
(Crafton) Patrolman Louis H. Hufnagel, Monday, September 8, 1919, Gunfire
(Turtle Creek) Police Officer Robert McLean Hamilton, Friday, April 4, 1919, Gunfire
(McKees Rocks) Patrolman James Joseph Hanley, Tuesday, March 11, 1919, Vehicle
(Homestead) Patrolman John L. Wilson, Sunday, September 8, 1918, Gunfire
Patrolman Thomas Patrick Farrell, Saturday, March 2, 1918, Gunfire 
(Harrison) Chief of Police Harry Meyers, Sunday, January 6, 1918, Gunfire
(Harrison) Officer William C. Lucas, Sr., Sunday, December 23, 1917, Gunfire
(Munhall) Patrolman Michael J. Lebedda, Saturday, November 17, 1917, Gunfire
Patrolman Edgar M. Hyland, Saturday, May 26, 1917, Assault
Patrolman Charles R. Edinger, Wednesday, June 6, 1917, Gunfire 
(McKeesport) Patrolman Anthony Hlavaty, Wednesday, May 16, 1917, Motorcycle
(McKeesport) Patrolman John E. Clifford, Wednesday, December 15, 1915, Vehicle
(Duquesne) Patrolman John Flynn, Thursday, October 7, 1915, Gunfire
Patrolman George H. Shearer, Tuesday, May 12, 1914, Gunfire 
Patrolman Michael Grab, Tuesday, March 3, 1914, Streetcar
Police Officer John J. McDonough, Monday, September 29, 1913, Assault
Deputy Sheriff J. Davis, Tuesday, January 28, 1913, Stabbed

1900s
Police Officer William Walsh, Wednesday, October 20, 1909, Drowned 
State Private John Curtis "Jack" Smith, Monday, August 23, 1909, Gunfire
Deputy Sheriff Harry H. Exley, Sunday, August 22, 1909, Gunfire 
State Private John L. Williams, Sunday, August 22, 1909, Gunfire
Police Officer James Farrell, Saturday, October 23, 1908, Gunfire   
(Wilkinsburg) Chief of Police Daniel E. Doncaster, Saturday, March 14, 1908, Illness
(Coraopolis) Patrolman Bruce A. Patton, Sunday, December 10, 1905, Gunfire
Wagonman George M. Cochran, Sunday, November 13, 1904, Vehicle 
Police Officer Casper Mayer, Friday, April 1, 1904, Electrocuted 
Police Officer Andrew J. Kelly, Sunday, October 4, 1903, Gunfire 
(Wilkinsburg) Chief of Police George W. Snyder, Sunday, May 17, 1903, Heart attack
Patrolman John Graham Kelty, Sunday, January 11, 1903, Streetcar
Police Officer James H. Sheehy, Sunday, May 18, 1902, Gunfire 
Det. Patrick Edward Fitzgerald, Friday, April 12, 1901, Gunfire
Police Officer David W. Lewis, Tuesday, August 7, 1900, Assault

1890s
Police Officer William Scanlon, Friday, July 8, 1898, Assault 
Police Officer Charles Metzgar, Wednesday, May 11, 1898, Gunfire 
Lieutenant John Alexander Berry, Wednesday, February 9, 1898, Fire
(Erie County Department of Corrections) Warden Thomas E. McCrea, Thursday, November 19, 1896, Assault
Police Officer Patrick F. Doyle, Thursday, August 8, 1895, Heart attack
(Allegheny City) Police Officer Peter Dillon, Thursday, September 20, 1894, Electrocuted
(McDonald) Constable Hugh Coyle, Saturday, August 6, 1892, Gunfire

1880s
Police Officer Thomas Chidlow, Thursday, May 24, 1888, Train
Police Officer George C. Woods, Monday, September 6, 1886, Fall 
Police Officer John F. "Benjamin" Evans, Thursday, August 6, 1885, Gunfire
Police Officer Edward O'Dwyer, Tuesday, July 5, 1881, Stabbed
(Allegheny City) Police Officer John Wiggins, Tuesday, November 9, 1880, Gunfire

1870s
Police Officer Thomas Lyons, Tuesday, July 16, 1878, Assault
Police Officer John Weimar, Monday, August 24, 1874, Gunfire
Police Officer Isaac Jones, Saturday, September 23, 1871, Assault

1860s
Police Officer Daniel McMullen, Saturday, December 18, 1869, Assault

1850s
Night Watchman Samuel Ferguson, Thursday, April 21, 1853, Stabbed

External links
Memorial homepage
City website on memorial

References

Law enforcement memorials
Law enforcement museums in the United States
1996 sculptures
2011 sculptures
Bronze sculptures in Pennsylvania